The Marble Mountains are a mountain range in the Eastern Mojave Desert and within Mojave Trails National Monument, in San Bernardino County, California.

Geography
The Marble Mountains are located just north of Cadiz, California, and are south of Bristol Dry Lake and Amboy, California. The Old Woman Mountains are to the east, and Bullion Mountains to the west.  The Sheep Hole Mountains and Twentynine Palms, California are to the southeast.

Geology
The Marble Mountains contain excellent exposures of Paleozoic sedimentary rocks.

The Marble Mountains Fossil Beds are the site of 550 million-year-old fossils of trilobites, which were among the first animals on earth with eyes and skeletons

Wilderness

Established in 1994 by the U.S. Congress, the Trilobite Wilderness encompasses the Marble Mountain range. The 37,308 acre wilderness area is managed by the Bureau of Land Management.

See also

External links
Trilobite Wilderness - BLM

References 

Mountain ranges of the Mojave Desert
Mountain ranges of San Bernardino County, California
Mojave Trails National Monument
Wilderness areas of California